Under the Gaslight is a lost 1914 silent film melodrama produced by the Biograph Company, for theatrical impresarios Klaw & Erlanger, and distributed by The General Film Company. It is based on the old Victorian stage melodrama of the same name by Augustin Daly popular in the 1860s and 1870s and revived periodically for years afterwards. This film was directed by Lawrence Marston and stars Lionel Barrymore.

Cast
Lionel Barrymore - William Byke
William Russell - Ray Trafford
Irene Howley - Pearl Courtland
Millicent Evans - Laura Courtland
Isabel Rea - Mrs. Courtland
Thomas Jefferson - Mr. Courtland
Hector Sarno - Snorky (*Hector V. Sarno)
Zoe Gregory - Blossom
Maurice Steuart - Laura as a child
Rosanna Logan - Pearl as a child

unbilled
Mrs. A.C. Marston - Judas

Cast note
In 1874 Maurice Barrymore, father of the star of the movie, arrived in the United States and joined Augustin Daly's stage company playing a role, Ray Trafford, in this play.

References

External links

1914 films
American silent feature films
Lost American films
American films based on plays
1914 drama films
Silent American drama films
American black-and-white films
Melodrama films
1914 lost films
Lost drama films
Films directed by Lawrence Marston
1910s American films